Sweyn of Denmark may refer to:

Sweyn Forkbeard (960–1014), King of Denmark, England, and Norway as Sweyn I.
Sweyn Knutsson (1016–1035), son of Cnut the Great.
Sweyn II of Denmark (1019–1074/76), King of Denmark
Sweyn the Crusader (1050–1097), son of Sweyn II
Svend Tronkræver (d. 1104), son of Sweyn II, potential claimant to Danish throne
Sweyn III of Denmark (1125–1157), King of Denmark